Rosenfield is a surname. Notable people with the surname include:

Andrew M. Rosenfield, American CEO
Allan Rosenfield, American medical care leader (1933-2008)
 Clare Rosenfield, LCSW, American philanthropist
Ethel Rosenfield (1910–2000), Canadian sculptor
Jim Rosenfield, American TV news anchor
John M. Rosenfield (1924 –2013), American art historian
Joseph Rosenfield (1904–2000), American lawyer and businessman

Fictional characters 
 Albert Rosenfield from television show Twin Peaks

See also
Rosenfeld (disambiguation)